The National Conference of Bishops of Brazil (Portuguese: Conferência Nacional dos Bispos do Brasil, CNBB) brings together the Catholic Bishops of Brazil, as the Code of Canon Law, "jointly exercise certain pastoral functions on behalf of the faithful of their territory in order to promote greater well that the Church gives to men, especially in the forms and methods of apostolate adapted to the circumstances of time and place, according to the law "(can. 447).

All diocesan bishops in Brazil belong to CNBB along with coadjutor bishops, auxiliary bishops and other titular Bishops who exercise in the same territory a special charge, entrusted by the Apostolic See or by the Conference of Bishops. (Cf. Can. 450)

The CNBB was founded on October 14, 1952, in Rio de Janeiro. The headquarters moved to Brasília in 1977.

Organization of CNBB
The National Conference of Bishops of Brazil has the following groups:
General Assembly
Regional Councils
Permanent Council
Episcopal Commissions
Presidency CNBB
Economic and Fiscal Councils
CONSEP
Bound Bodies
General Secretariat
National Advisors

Presidents of CNBB
Cardinal Carlos Carmelo Vasconcellos Motta 1952 - 1958
Cardinal Jaime de Barros Câmara 1958 - 1964
Cardinal Agnelo Rossi 1964 - 1971
Cardinal Aloísio Lorscheider 1971 - 1979
Ivo Lorscheiter 1979 - 1987
Luciano Mendes de Almeida 1987 - 1995
Cardinal Lucas Moreira Neves OP 1995 - 1998
Jayme Henrique Chemello 1998 - 2003
Cardinal Geraldo Majella Agnelo 2003 - 2007
Geraldo Lyrio Rocha 2007 - 2011
Cardinal Raymundo Damasceno Assis 2011-2015
Cardinal Sérgio da Rocha 2015-2019
Walmor Oliveira de Azevedo 2019-present

See also
Catholic Church in Brazil

References

External links

Brazil
Catholic Church in Brazil
Christian organizations established in 1952
1952 in Christianity
1952 establishments in Brazil